Anatoly Mikhailovich Bykov (born 6 August 1953) is a retired Soviet welterweight Greco-Roman wrestler. He won a world title in 1975 and an Olympic gold medal in 1976, and placed second at the 1978 European Championships and 1980 Olympics, both times behind Ferenc Kocsis.

Bykov lived for many years in Almaty, Kazakhstan, where in 1975 he married and graduated from the institute of physical education. He holds a Kazakhstani passport, but lives in Canada, where he works in building construction.

References

External links

1953 births
Living people
Soviet male sport wrestlers
Olympic wrestlers of the Soviet Union
Wrestlers at the 1976 Summer Olympics
Wrestlers at the 1980 Summer Olympics
Russian male sport wrestlers
Olympic gold medalists for the Soviet Union
Olympic medalists in wrestling
Medalists at the 1980 Summer Olympics
Medalists at the 1976 Summer Olympics
Olympic silver medalists for the Soviet Union
European Wrestling Championships medalists
World Wrestling Championships medalists